Soroush Ahmadi  (born 17 November 1996 in Juybar) is an Iranian taekwondo competitor. He won the silver medal at the 2019 World Taekwondo Championships on the men's bantamweights.

References 

Iranian male taekwondo practitioners
1996 births
Living people
Universiade gold medalists for Iran
Universiade medalists in taekwondo
Medalists at the 2019 Summer Universiade
World Taekwondo Championships medalists
Asian Taekwondo Championships medalists
People from Juybar
Sportspeople from Mazandaran province
20th-century Iranian people
21st-century Iranian people